SMS Preussen (Ger.orth: Preußen) was the name of two vessels of the Imperial German Navy:

 , a turret ship
 , a battleship

German Navy ship names